Merry Company is a c. 1620-1622 painting by the Dutch artist Willem Pieterszoon Buytewech, now in the Museum of Fine Arts, in Budapest. It belongs to the merry company sub-genre of the genre painting.

Sources
http://www.wga.hu/html/b/buytewec/merry_co.html

Paintings in the collection of the Museum of Fine Arts (Budapest)
1622 paintings
Dutch Golden Age paintings
Genre paintings